Adler's Appetite is an American hard rock band from Los Angeles, California. Formed in 2003 by eponymous former Guns N' Roses drummer Steven Adler, the supergroup was originally known as Suki Jones and included vocalist Jizzy Pearl, guitarists Keri Kelli and Brent Muscat, and bassist Robbie Crane. The group disbanded in 2011 and Adler formed an eponymous band including vocalist Jacob Bunton, guitarist Lonny Paul and bassist Johnny Martin. After Adler broke up in 2017, the drummer reformed Adler's Appetite with vocalist Constantine Maroulis, guitarists Michael Thomas and Carl Restivo, and bassist Sean McNabb. As of November 2021, the group includes Adler, Thomas, vocalist Ari Kamin, rhythm guitarist Alistair James and bassist Todd Kerns.

History

2003–2006
Suki Jones was unveiled in March 2003, originally including Adler, vocalist Jizzy Pearl (of Ratt, Love/ Hate and formerly L.A. Guns), guitarists Keri Kelli (formerly of Slash's Snakepit and L.A. Guns) and Brent Muscat (of Faster Pussycat, and formerly L.A. Guns), and Robbie Crane (of Ratt, and formerly the Vince Neil Band). During an early tour in May, Warrant guitarist Erik Turner temporarily substituted for Muscat, who was touring with Faster Pussycat. The band's name was changed to Adler's Appetite in June, to reflect the band's set list which included many songs from the debut Guns N' Roses album Appetite for Destruction. The following month, Pearl was replaced by Sean Crosby, frontman of AC/DC tribute act Back in Black. However, in August it was announced that Pearl had returned to the group for all upcoming tour dates. By the time the group recorded its self-titled debut EP, Muscat was no longer a member of Adler's Appetite. In March 2005, after the EP's release, Pearl left the band again.

Pearl was replaced by Sheldon Tarsha. Beautiful Creatures guitarist Michael Thomas, Izzy Stradlin's guitarist J.T. Longoria and Enuff Z'nuff bassist Chip Z'nuff subsequently replaced Kelli and Crane. In January 2006, it was reported that Adler had fired the band during a European tour. He later performed with several local musicians, including members of Guns N' Rose tribute bands. Adler addressed the European tour controversy in March, confirming that Tarsha, Thomas, Longoria and Z'nuff were no longer members of Adler's Appetite. The band toured in the summer with Faster Pussycat and Bang Tango, with a lineup including Adler, Crane and Bang Tango members Joe Lesté on vocals and Mark Simpson on guitar. Lesté had previously substituted for Pearl, who was unavailable due to "personal obligations", during a Japanese tour in March 2005. The band subsequently went on hiatus, although the previously unreleased song "Sadder Days" was released in April 2007.

2007–2011
In July 2007, the return of Adler's Appetite's was announced for a run of summer shows, with the lineup consisting of Adler, Thomas, Z'nuff and new members Colby Veil of Guns N' Roses tribute band Hollywood Roses on vocals, and Kristy Majors of Pretty Boy Floyd on guitar. The band continued touring sporadically, before unveiling a new lineup in late 2008 – in November, former Quiet Riot guitarist Alex Grossi took the place of Majors on guitar, and in December he announced that Tarsha had returned to the group as frontman. The vocalist lasted just one US tour, before departing again in April 2009. He was replaced a few days later by Rick Stitch, and the group returned to touring. In June, former Quiet Riot bassist Chuck Wright temporarily filled in for Z'nuff.

The group began recording its debut album later in the year, with "Alive" released as the first new material in July 2010. "Stardog" and "Fading" were released later in December. In early 2011, Grossi left Adler's Appetite to focus on Quiet Riot, which he had recently rejoined; Stitch's Ladyjack bandmate Robo temporarily substituted for the guitarist, before both members left in March to focus on Ladyjack. Adler's Appetite returned in April with new vocalist Patrick Stone (of Aces 'N' Eights) and guitarist Lonny Paul. Despite news that the group had begun recording new material, in September it was announced that Z'nuff had left the band. Adler quickly clarified the bassist's departure, claiming that he was dismissed due to the drummer's intention to start a new group.

2012 onwards
In March 2012, Adler unveiled his new eponymous band Adler, which would include Lynam frontman Jacob Bunton, Adler's Appetite guitarist Lonny Paul and bassist Johnny Martin. The band released its debut album Back from the Dead in November, which was produced by former Dokken and Dio bassist Jeff Pilson. Despite reports that a second album was due for release in February 2016, Adler announced the dissolution of his eponymous band in February 2017 with the claim that "rock and roll doesn't sell". After another hiatus, in February 2018 former Adler's Appetite guitarist Alex Grossi suggested that the group was set to reunite for a tour celebrating the 30th anniversary of Appetite for Destruction. In April, the band's lineup was announced as featuring vocalist Constantine Maroulis, lead guitarist Michael Thomas, rhythm guitarist Carl Restivo and bassist Sean McNabb. Later in the year, the band included vocalist Ari Kamin, rhythm guitarist Alistair James and bassist Tanya O'Callaghan. In November 2021, O'Callaghan left Adler's Appetite when Whitesnake hired her to replace long-time bassist Michael Devin, whom that band parted ways with, becoming Whitesnake's first female member and was replaced a few days later by Todd Kerns as a stand-in until her successor has been named.

Members

Current members

Former members

Touring musicians

Timeline

Lineups

References

External links
Adler's Appetite official website

Adler's Appetite